Apiorhynchostoma is a genus of fungi in the family Boliniaceae; according to the 2007 Outline of Ascomycota. The placement was confirmed in 2020.

Species
As accepted by Species Fungorum;

 Apiorhynchostoma altipetum 
 Apiorhynchostoma apiculatum 
 Apiorhynchostoma tumulatum 

Former species;
 A. apiosporum  = Apiorhynchostoma apiculatum
 A. curreyi  = Apiorhynchostoma apiculatum
 A. occultum  = Endoxyla occulta Boliniaceae

References

External links
Index Fungorum

Xylariales